Fawley railway station was the terminus of the Totton, Hythe and Fawley Light Railway, which was built along the coast of Southampton Water to connect  and Fawley and to provide a freight link from the South West Main Line to Fawley Refinery.

History
The station opened on 20 July 1925 and closed to passengers on 14 February 1966 and goods on 2 January 1967.

Present situation

In June 2009 the Association of Train Operating Companies published a report (Connecting Communities: Expanding Access to the Rail Network) strongly indicating that the reopening of Hythe station, to serve the village of Hythe, north of Fawley, would be viable, in that the ratio of business, economic and social benefits to costs would be as high as 4.8. However the ATOC report did not suggest any passenger service for Fawley, or anywhere south of Hythe.

The last train serving the refinery ran on 1 September 2016, after which trains would run only as far as Marchwood.

Proposed reopening

In August 2018, it was revealed that plans to reopen the Fawley Branch Line had been resurrected as part of the redevelopment known as Fawley Waters. At  the journey time would take 12 minutes and the linespeed would be . Fawley station, if reopened, would be known as Hythe & Fawley Parkway which would serve both Hythe and Fawley. The line has been identified as a priority for reopening to passenger use by Campaign for Better Transport.

Route

References 

Disused railway stations in Hampshire
Former Southern Railway (UK) stations
Railway stations in Great Britain opened in 1925
Railway stations in Great Britain closed in 1966